The Ashtadiggajas is a group of eight legendary elephants that appear in Hindu cosmology, serving as the guardians of the eight zones of the universe. There are also eight female elephants that stand beside the Ashtadiggajas, referred to as the Ashtadikkarinis.

List 
There are a total of eight Ashtadiggjas and Ashtadikkarinis that stand guard over the eight zones:

Literature 
Besides the Ashtadiggajas, there are four elephants who support the earth from the four directions from the netherworld, whose names are given in the Ramayana: Virūpākṣa (east), Mahāpadmasama (south), Saumanasa (west), and Bhadra (north).

In popular culture 
The popular rendition of the World Turtle supporting one or several World Elephants is recorded in 1599 in a letter by Emanual de Veiga. Wilhelm von Humboldt claimed, without any proof, that the idea of a world-elephant maybe due to a confusion, caused by the Sanskrit noun Nāga having the dual meaning of "serpent" and "elephant" (named for its serpent-like trunk), thus representing a corrupted account of the world-serpent. 

Brewer's Dictionary of Phrase and Fable lists Maha-pudma and Chukwa are names from a "popular rendition of a Hindu myth in which the tortoise Chukwa supports the elephant Maha-pudma, which in turn supports the world". The spelling Mahapudma originates as a misprint of Mahapadma in Sri Aurobindo's 1921 retelling of a story of the Mahabharata.

See also
Dikpalas
 Gaja
 World Turtle

References

Elephant
Hindu legendary creatures
Mythological elephants
Elephants in Hinduism